All in with Cam Newton is an American  reality television series hosted by former New England Patriots and current Carolina Panthers star quarterback, Cam Newton. It premiered on June 3, 2016, on Nickelodeon.

Premise
Newton helps kids get close to accomplishing their dreams. Whatever their dream is, experts in that field are recruited to help them learn and get better at it.

The show has had special appearances from people such as Lisa Leslie, Tom Kenny, Sutton Foster and Michelle Obama.

Episodes

See also
 Jagger Eaton's Mega Life

References

External links

2010s Nickelodeon original programming
2016 American television series debuts
2016 American television series endings
2010s American reality television series
English-language television shows